Clanville is a hamlet in the civil parish of Penton Grafton in the Test Valley district of Hampshire, England. The hamlet lies within the North Downs Area Of Outstanding Natural Beauty on the Hampshire-Wiltshire border. Its nearest town is Andover, which lies approximately 5.6 miles (9.1 km) south-east from the village.

Notable former residents
 Archie Bland – writer, journalist and former Deputy Editor of The Independent newspaper
 Lady Georgia Byng – children's author
 The Hon. Jamie Byng – owner of Canongate Books
 Sir Christopher Bland – former Chairman of British Telecom, the BBC and the RSC

External links

Hamlets in Hampshire
Test Valley